The HUMAN Resource is a drum and bass compilation album presented by Dieselboy. The first disc is unmixed and the second disc is mixed by Evol Intent on Ableton. The CD art was designed by Dieselboy (Damian Higgins) with graphic artist Joel Savitzky. The HUMAN Resource was released on April 6, 2006 and debuted at number 14 on Billboards Electronic Album chart.

Track listing 
Disc one:
"Paradise Lost (D-Star Remix)" – Vector Burn
"Mass Hysteria (Hive Remix)" – Bad Company UK
"Houston" – Kaos, Karl K, & Jae Kennedy
"Subculture (Upbeats Remix)" – Styles of Beyond
"Wargames '03" – DJ Fresh
"Catherine Wheel" – Skynet
"The Rapture" – Evol Intent & Ewun
"Grunge 3 (Dieselboy, Kaos, & Karl K Remix)" – Bad Company UK
"Barrier Break (Infiltrata & Hochi Remix)" – Dieselboy & Kaos feat. Messinian
"Broken Sword" – Evol Intent, Mayhem, & Think Tank
"Submission" – Dieselboy & Kaos
"Studio 54" – Kaos, Karl K, & Jae Kennedy

Disc two:
"Vivify" – Evol Intent & Dieselboy
"Parallel Universe" – Infiltrata & Define
"Broken Sword" – Evol Intent, Mayhem, & Think Tank
"Piss Friend" – The Upbeats
"Moonraker (Gridlok Remix)" – Kaos, Karl K, & Jae Kennedy
"Assimilation" – Evol Intent, Mayhem, & Psidream
"Subculture (Upbeat Remix)" – Styles of Beyond
"Xanadu (Stratus Remix)" – Kaos, Karl K, & Jae Kennedy
"Wargames '03" – DJ Fresh
"Mass Hysteria (Hive Remix)" – Bad Company UK
"Barrier Break" – Dieselboy & Kaos
"Barrier Break (Infiltrata & Hochi Remix)" – Dieselboy & Kaos
"Reality Check" – Evol Intent & Ewun
"Le Mammoth" – Upbeats
"The Rapture" – Evol Intent & Ewun
"Knowledge of Self (Evol Intent Remix)" – BT
"Grunge 3 (Dieselboy, Kaos, & Karl K Remix)" – Bad Company UK
"The Divide" – Ewun
"You Must Follow (Anthology)" – Stratus
"Atlantic State (Gridlok Remix)" – Dieselboy & Technical Itch
"Submission" – Dieselboy & Kaos
"Fundamental (Gridlok Remix)" – Sasha
"The Great Escape (Alliance Remix)" – BT

See also
 Human Imprint
 The 6ixth Session
 The Dungeonmaster's Guide
 Substance D

External links

The HUMAN Resource at SystemRecordings.com
 http://www.djdieselboy.com – Official Website
 
 http://www.discogs.com/artist/Dieselboy
 HumanImprint at MySpace
 http://www.systemrecordings.com
 http://www.planetofthedrums.com

References

Review by Mark Jenkins of The HUMAN Resource in The Washington Post, June 30, 2006
 

Dieselboy albums
2006 compilation albums